Tŏksŏng County is a county in South Hamgyŏng province, North Korea.

Geography
It is largely mountainous, but the southern area is low-lying.  The Pujŏllyŏng, Taedŏk, and Kŏdubong (거두봉) ranges pass through the county. The highest point is Hŭisabong.  Major streams include the Kŏsŏch'ŏn (거서천), Konp'ach'ŏn (곤파천), and Tongp'allyŏngch'ŏn (통팔령천).

Temperatures are typically quite low. About 89% of the county is forestland, of which some 70% is coniferous. Thanks to this, lumbering is an important local industry.

Administrative divisions
Tŏksŏng county is divided into 1 ŭp (town), 1 rodongjagu (workers' districts) and 23 ri (villages):

Economy
The local economy is centred on manufacturing, although agriculture also plays a role. Manufacturing accounts for 90% of local production. Local crops include maize, soybeans, and potatoes; these are chiefly grown along the valleys. There are also orchards and silkworm farms. Mining is supported by deposits of iron ore, gold, fluorspar, and magnetite.  Hydroelectric power stations can also be found in the county.

Transportation
Tŏksŏng county is served roads and by the Tŏksŏng line of the Korean State Railway.

See also
Geography of North Korea
Administrative divisions of North Korea

References

External links

Counties of South Hamgyong